Michael Bedard (born June 26, 1949) is a Canadian children's writer. He was born and raised in Toronto, Ontario, Canada. He graduated from the University of Toronto in 1971 with a BA in philosophy and English. He began writing when his former high school teacher showed him works of Emily Dickinson and T. S. Eliot. Bedard currently lives in Toronto with his wife Martha. He has four children and five grandchildren.

Works 

 Woodsedge and Other Tales: A Gathering of Tales (Toronto: Gardenshore Press, 1979), stories
 Pipe and Pearls (Gardenshore, 1980), stories
 A Darker Magic (Atheneum, 1987)
 The Lightning Bolt, illustrated by Regolo Ricci (1989)
 Redwork (Atheneum, 1990)
 The Tinder Box, illus. Ricci (1990) – retelling Hans Christian Andersen's "The Tinderbox"
 The Nightingale, illus. Ricci (1991) – retelling Andersen's "The Nightingale"
 Emily, illus. Barbara Cooney (1992) – biographical fiction, featuring Emily Dickinson
 Painted Devil (Atheneum, 1994) – sequel to A Darker Magic
 Glass Town: The Secret World of the Brontë Children, illus. Laura Fernandez and Rick Jacobson (1997) – biographical, featuring the Brontë family
 The Divide, illus. Emily Arnold McCully (1997) – biographical, featuring Willa Cather
 The Clay Ladies, illus. Les Tait (1999) 
 The Wolf of Gubbio, illus. Murray Kimber (Stoddart Kids, 2000) – "based on a legend of St. Francis of Assisi", 
 Stained Glass (Tundra, 2001)
 The Painted Wall and Other Strange Tales: Selected and Adapted from the Liao-Chai of Pu Sung-ling (Tundra, 2003) – retelling of Liaozhai Zhiyi (Strange Stories from a Chinese Studio) by Pu Songling
 William Blake: The Gates of Paradise (2006) – biographical, featuring William Blake
 The Green Man (Tundra, 2012) – sequel to A Darker Magic

A Darker Magic 

Bedard's first novel, A Darker Magic (1987), is about an old teacher (Miss Potts) who discovers a handbill for a magic show which reminds her of the death of a friend from her childhood which she blames on the magic show. With the help of a student (Emily), they are able to prevent the show from happening. Dale Gale calls the work "rich in language and riveting in tone: it brims with a sense of foreboding that is sustained throughout" and a "well-crafted eerie novel that demands to be read again".

Redwork 

Bedard's second novel, Redwork (1990), won the Governor General's Literary Award, the Canadian Library Association Book of the Year for Children Award and the IODE Violet Downey Book Award. According to Margaret A. Chang, the novel "falls short of the high standard set by Margaret Mahy's Memory, the consummate tale of interaction between young and old". Another reviewer said that Bedard was "working on a new level" and that "everything is described in detail and every point is made through dialogue".

The Painted Devil 

The Painted Devil is a sequel to A Darker Magic, set in the same town of Caledon 28 years later. The story features Emily and her niece Alice.

The Green Man 

The Green Man is a sequel to A Darker Magic. The story follows Emily's niece, Ophelia, as she battles the next generation of the same dangerous magic her Aunt Emily faced as a child. The publisher blurbed, "At once an exploration of poetry, a story of family relationships, and an intriguing mystery, The Green Man is Michael Bedard at his finest."

Awards and honors 
Redwork
 Governor General's Literary Award, Canada, 1990
 Canadian Library Association Book of the Year Award for Children, 1991
 IODE Violet Downey Book Award, 1991
The Nightmare on main street by freddy krouger
 IODE Children's Book Award, 1991 (Bedard and Regolo Ricci)The Clay Ladies IODE Children's Book Award, 1999 (Bedard and Les Tait)The Green Man IODE Violet Downey Book Award, 2013

 References 

 External links 

 
 
 LAC 0101H6833 (Michael John Bédard, born 1949) – Library and Archives Canada data at VIAF.org– "not the same person as author of Sitting Ducks'' (Windsor, Ontario-born Los Angeles poster artist) 

1949 births
Canadian children's writers
University of Toronto alumni
Writers from Toronto
Canadian male novelists
20th-century Canadian novelists
21st-century Canadian novelists
Living people
20th-century Canadian male writers
21st-century Canadian male writers